Kwik Snax is an arcade style maze video game play developed by the Oliver Twins and was published in 1990 by Codemasters for the Amstrad, Spectrum, Commodore 64, MS-DOS, and Amiga. It was the fifth game in the Dizzy series and is considered a sequel to Fast Food.

After the Oliver twins had completed Operation Gunship they wanted to release another puzzle game similar to Fast Food which only required two weeks of development time, but unexpectedly it required much more time.

The Rear cover (Amstrad Version) says "Dizzy to the rescue! Outwit Zaks' court jesters, bumble bees, clockwork mice and more in the Land of Personality. Mega features and fantastic fun in the incredibly playable, action packed, arcade puzzle game!"

Reception

Kwik Snax received a 92/100 from both Your Sinclair and Crash magazines.

The Commodore 64 port, which was different even in gameplay from the ZX Spectrum, did not have such a glamorous reception. Zzap!64 awarded 80/100, mentioning a lack of polish on the graphics and AI of the game.

References

External links

1990 video games
Amiga games
Amstrad CPC games
Atari ST games
Codemasters games
Commodore 64 games
Dizzy (series)
DOS games
Europe-exclusive video games
Video games about food and drink
ZX Spectrum games
Video games developed in the United Kingdom